The sixteenth season of Deutschland sucht den Superstar began on 5 January 2019 in RTL. Dieter Bohlen returned for his sixteenth series as a judge, while Oana Nechiti, Xavier Naidoo and Pietro Lombardi are the new judges. Oliver Geissen returned for his fifth series as host. The winner was the 20 years old Davin Herbrüggen.

Finalists

"Mottoshows"

Color key

Top 10 - "Chartbreaker"
Original airdate: 6 April 2019

Top 8 - "Retro-Hits"
Original airdate: 13 April 2019

Top 6 - Semi-Final: "Magischen Moment" (Magic Moment)
Original airdate: 20 April 2019

Top 4 - Finale (Solo song & Winner's single)
Original airdate: 27 April 2019

Elimination chart

References

External links 
 Official website

Season 16
2019 in German music
2019 German television seasons